Jacky Axiel Ruben (born 24 June 1996 or 10 November 1996) is a Vanuatuan footballer who plays as a midfielder for Erakor Golden Star He made his debut for the national team on March 25, 2016 in their 1–0 win against New Caledonia.

International career

International goals
Scores and results list Vanuatu's goal tally first.

Honours

National team
2013 OFC U-17 Championship: Third Place
2014 OFC U-20 Championship: Second Place

Individual honours 
2014 OFC U-20 Championship: Golden Ball

References

External links
 

1996 births
Living people
Vanuatuan footballers
Association football defenders
Vanuatu international footballers
Erakor Golden Star F.C. players
2016 OFC Nations Cup players
Vanuatu youth international footballers
Vanuatu under-20 international footballers